Neodrymonia rufa is a moth in the family Notodontidae. It was described by Yang in 1995. It is found in northern Vietnam and the Chinese provinces of Yunnan, Jiangxi, Hunan and Fujian.

References

Moths described in 1995
Notodontidae